Aazhi Alayaazhi is a 1978 Indian Malayalam film,  directed by Mani Swamy. The film stars Kaviyoor Ponnamma, Anupama, Sukumaran and K. P. Ummer in the lead roles. The film has musical score by G. Devarajan.

Cast
Kaviyoor Ponnamma
Anupama
Sukumaran
K. P. Ummer
Kuthiravattam Pappu

Soundtrack
The music was composed by G. Devarajan and the lyrics were written by P. Bhaskaran.

References

External links
 

1978 films
1970s Malayalam-language films